Flying Fish Records was a record label founded in Chicago in 1974 that specialized in folk, blues, and country music. In the 1990s the label was sold to Rounder Records.

Bruce Kaplan, the label's founder, was a native of Chicago and the son of a president of Zenith Electronics. He studied anthropology at the University of Chicago and became president of the school's folklore society. He began Flying Fish in 1974 to concentrate on traditional and contemporary folk music, though the catalog grew to include blues, bluegrass, country, jazz, reggae, dancefloor and rock.

When Kaplan started the label, most similarly oriented companies produced albums with decidedly "homemade" packaging (e.g. cover art, etc.) and marketed the albums to a relatively narrow audience of aficionados. Kaplan realized that music of this sort had the potential to reach a wider audience, but needed to be packaged in a professional manner; people not already devotees were unlikely to take a chance on something that did not look like it came from a "real" record company. Kaplan also invested in broader promotion of the music (wide provision of albums to radio; targeted advertising to back up tours). Essentially, he located a niche between the hit-based promotion model of the major labels and the faith of the small independents that the music would find its own audience. Flying Fish recording artists were able to find that audience at the local Evanston, Illinois, venue Amazingrace Coffeehouse, which presented numerous artists off the roster, including Vassar Clements, John Hartford, New Grass Revival, Norman Blake, and Claudia Schmidt.

Starting with the Hillbilly Jazz double album featuring fiddler Vassar Clements, and following up with a Grammy Award winning album by John Hartford, Flying Fish Records's success with this niche approach led to similar changes by many other roots labels of the period.

In December 1992, Kaplan developed an ear infection that did not respond to antibiotic treatment and he died unexpectedly. After a brief period under the direction of longtime employee Jim Netter, supported by Kaplan's widow Sandra Shifrin (a social worker), the label was sold to Rounder Records, where Kaplan had worked as a producer for a brief period before founding Flying Fish. The label bought Hogeye Music in the mid-1980s. Flying Fish distributed Blind Pig Records and Rooster Blues.

Roster

 Adam Rudolph
 Andrew Odom
 Anne Hills 
 Arlen Roth
 Austin Lounge Lizards
 Aztec Two-Step
 Barry Mitterhoff
 Benny Martin
 Big Twist and the Mellow Fellows
 Blue Riddim Band
 Bob Franke
 Bonnie Koloc
 Boogie Bill Webb
 Brave Old World
 Bryan Bowers
 Buddy Emmons
 Chubby Carrier
 Cache Valley Drifters
 Cephas & Wiggins
 Chris Daniels
 Chris Smither
 Chubby Carrier
 Chuck Suchy
 Claudia Schmidt
 Country Gazette
 Critton Hollow String Band 
 David Amram
 David Mallett
 David Massengill
 Doc Watson
 Don Lange
 Doug Dillard
 Doug Jernigan
 Eddy Clearwater
 Erwin Helfer
 Eternal Wind
 Filé (band)
 Flor de Caña
 Foday Musa Suso
 Frankie Armstrong
 Frankie Lee
 Fred Holstein
 Fred Small
 Freeman & Lange
 Gamble Rogers
 Gary Primich
 Geoff Muldaur
 Gillman Deaville
 Guy Carawan
 Gove Scrivenor
 Hassan Hakmoun
 Hickory Wind
 Hot Rize
 Hotmud Family
 James Sapp
 Jan A. P. Kaczmarek
 Jason Eklund
 Jean Ritchie
 Jim Post
 Joel Rubin
 John Hartford
 John Kruth
 John Renbourn
 Keith Mansfield
 Kenny Sultan & Tom Ball
 Killbilly
 The Klezmatics
 Larry Long
 Larry McNeely
 Laurie Lewis
 Lester Flatt
 Linda Waterfall
 Little Mike and the Tornadoes
 Mary McCaslin
 Merle Watson
 Michael Peter Smith
 Morrigan
 New Grass Revival
 Norman Blake
 Northern Lights
 Pat Burton
 Patent Pending 
 Paul Geremia
 Pete Seeger
 Peter Rowan
 Preston Reed
 Priscilla Herdman
 Randy Sabien
 Rare Air
 Robin Petrie
 Roy Book Binder
 Sam Bush
 Satan and Adam
 Shel Silverstein
 Shinobu Sato
 Si Kahn
 Simon & Bard
 The Smith Sisters
 Sparky and Rhonda Rucker
 Stéphane Grappelli
 Steve Lyon
 Sweet Honey in the Rock
 T. Michael Coleman
 Terry Garthwaite
 Those Darn Accordions
 Tom Ball & Kenny Sultan
 Tom Chapin
 Tom Dreesen
 Tom Juravich
 Tom Paxton
 Tony Trischka
 Toshi Reagon
 Tracy Nelson
 Trian
 Tut Taylor
 Valerie Wellington
 Vassar Clements
 Yasmeen Williams

See also
 List of record labels

References

American independent record labels
Record labels established in 1974
Blues record labels
American country music record labels
Folk record labels
Defunct companies based in Chicago